Earl MacDonald (born July 26, 1970) is a Canadian pianist, composer, arranger, conductor, recording artist, and educator specializing in jazz. Described as "a magical, musical alchemist of hip hybrids", MacDonald's compositional work frequently draws upon other musical styles, fusing them with jazz. The Winnipeg native has been employed as director of jazz studies at the University of Connecticut since the fall of 2000.

Early years

MacDonald was born and raised in Winnipeg, Manitoba, Canada.  His father, Keith MacDonald, is an avid bagpiper who authored "The Church Piper" book series.  MacDonald has one sibling, Janine Mackie, a journalist and freelance writer based in Surrey, British Columbia.

MacDonald began taking music lessons at age five, starting on electronic organ.  As a teenager he earned money playing the organ for Winnipeg Jets hockey games (1985-1988).  He attended Silver Heights Collegiate Institute, where his high school stage band was nationally recognized, winning "Most Outstanding" and Gold awards at the 1988 MusicFest Canada competition.  Also during high school, MacDonald began taking classical piano lessons with Darrel Loewen and Shirley Kwok at the Manitoba Conservatory for Music and Arts.  He also studied music theory with Francis Sanderson.

Education & musical training
MacDonald earned a bachelor of music degree in 1992 from McGill University in Montreal, Quebec, Canada, where he majored in jazz performance.  His jazz piano teachers included Fred Henke, Luc Beaugrand and André White.  He studied arranging with Christopher Smith, composition with Jan Jarczyk, and improvisation with trumpeter Kevin Dean.

MacDonald's graduate studies spanned 1993 to 1995 at Rutgers University in New Brunswick, New Jersey.  He apprenticed with Kenny Barron who recorded MacDonald's composition, "Wanton Spirit" while he was still a graduate student. The song was released as the title track of Barron's Grammy-nominated CD with Roy Haynes and Charlie Haden.  At Rutgers, MacDonald studied arranging with Michael Philip Mossman and played in ensembles under the direction of Ralph Bowen.

MacDonald has augmented his formal education by participating in the BMI Jazz Composers' Workshop under the direction of Jim McNeely, Michael Abene and Mike Holober.  He also attended the Summer Jazz Workshop in Banff, Canada in 2001, and has audited conducting courses at UConn with Dr. Jeffrey Renshaw.

Maynard Ferguson & Big Bop Nouveau
MacDonald joined Maynard Ferguson's touring band in 1998, following a one-year teaching appointment at Bowling Green State University.  He worked with Ferguson for two years, performing across North America, Europe and Asia.  One studio album was recorded during MacDonald's tenure with Ferguson: "Big City Rhythms", a collaboration with singer Michael Feinstein.  Video recordings of several concerts have been publicly released, including MacDonald's second performance with the band, which was released on DVD as "Maynard Ferguson - Live from the King Cat Theatre" (in Seattle, WA).

MacDonald's bandmates with Ferguson included:
 trumpeters Carl Fischer, Scott Englebright, Adolfo Acosta, Michael Bogart, Brian Ploeger, Thomas Marriott, Frank Abrahamson & Pete Ferguson
 trombonists Rodney Lancaster, Mike Bravin, Kelsley Grant & Reggie Watkins
 saxophonists Mike Dubaniewicz, Jeff Rupert, Mike MacArthur, Kelly Jefferson & Jim Brenan
 bassists Paul Thompson, Nathan Peck & Brian Stahurski
 drummers Dave Throckmorton & Brian Wolfe

In 1999, upon the departure of bassist Paul Thompson, Ferguson appointed MacDonald musical director of Big Bop Nouveau.  As musical director, MacDonald rehearsed the ensemble, selected performance repertoire, made personnel recommendations and wrote musical arrangements.

In the lineage of Ferguson's pianists, MacDonald succeeded Ron Oswanski.  Following MacDonald's departure in 2000, Ferguson hired Bryn Roberts and later Will Bonness, both of whom were MacDonald's former students from Winnipeg, Manitoba, Canada.

Teaching
At the post-secondary level MacDonald has taught at:
 St. Francis Xavier University in Nova Scotia (1996-1997),
 Bowling Green State University in Ohio (1997-1998), and at 
 the University of Connecticut (2000–present)

At UCONN he teaches courses in improvisation and arranging, while also directing student ensembles and administering the jazz program. He was tenured and promoted to Associate Professor in 2005.  Beyond his primary teaching position, MacDonald frequently participates as a clinician, guest conductor and teacher at summer camps.  In recent years he has taught at the Kincardine Summer Music Festival, Jazz In July at UMASS Amherst and Marshall University's "Jazz-MU-Tazz" camp in West Virginia.

Awards, nominations & recognition

Professional
 2003: Sammy Nestico Award, for outstanding big band arrangement, sponsored by the USAF
 2003: Artist Fellowship, Connecticut Commission on the Arts
 2004: Best Jazz Group, Hartford Advocate's Reader's Poll (the Earl MacDonald 6)
 2003: Parent's Choice Award for "Treblemakers Jazz It Up" CD.
 2007: Finalist, Charlie Parker/BMI Jazz Composition Award
 2008: Finalist, ArtEZ Jazz Composition Contest, the Netherlands
 2009: Artist Fellowship, Connecticut Commission on Culture and Tourism
 2011: JUNO award nomination for Traditional Jazz Album of the Year
 2011: 10th Annual Independent Music Awards, winner, jazz song category
 2011: Best Jazz Group, Hartford Advocate readers' poll (New Directions Ensemble)
 2011: Finalist, ArtEZ Jazz Composition Contest, the Netherlands
 2014: JUNO award nomination for Contemporary Jazz Album of the Year

Academic
 2003: AAUP Excellence Award for Teaching Promise
 2004: New Scholar Award, School of Fine Arts, University of Connecticut
 2006: AAUP Excellence Award for Teaching Innovation
 2011: UConn School of Fine Arts Special Achievement Award
 2013: UConn School of Fine Arts Outstanding Faculty Award

Musical ensembles

Jazz Orchestra (Big Band)

MacDonald has released two albums of his compositions and arrangements for 17-piece jazz orchestra (big band): "UConn Jazz" (2002) and "Re:Visions - Works for Jazz Orchestra" (2010). The latter received a Juno Award nomination for traditional jazz album of the year in 2011. Reviewer, Dan Bilawsky asserted, "Re:Visions goes beyond where most big bands go and the music here establishes Earl MacDonald as a major force in the world of jazz composition."

MacDonald's big band arrangements are published through eJazz Lines.

C.O.W. (Creative Opportunity Workshop)

In 2013 MacDonald released an album with the unorthodox instrumentation of cello, saxophone, percussion and piano.  MacDonald said, "This band, the Creative Opportunity Workshop, was formed to serve as a personal playground for experimentation and fusions." The CD, "Mirror of the Mind" received a JUNO award nomination for contemporary jazz album of the year and a garnered many favorable reviews.

New Directions Ensemble

MacDonald currently serves as Musical Director and Composer-In-Residence for the Hartford Jazz Society's New Directions Ensemble.  The group's instrumentation consists of 2 trumpets, 1 trombone, 1 French horn, 3 saxophones (1 alto, 1 tenor, 1 bari), piano, bass and drums. Owen McNally of the Hartford Courant described the band and outlined its mission, stating "the fresh-sounding New Directions Ensemble taps into the rich lode of area talent, provides a vital forum for original compositions, spreads the good word about contemporary band music in its educational role, and provides a prominent public face for its sponsor, the Hartford Jazz Society. The New Directions Ensemble is set to swing in its own fresh way, generating contemporary band music that lives in the present, independent, cliché-free and untethered to conventional big band nostalgia."

Discography

Albums as leader

Recorded collaborations

Personal life

Currently, MacDonald lives in Mansfield, CT with his wife, Jana (née Smith).  The couple were married in 2003 in South Windsor, CT.  Together they have two young children.

References

External links 
 Earl MacDonald's Home Page

1970 births
Living people
Canadian jazz pianists
Canadian music arrangers
Canadian jazz composers
Canadian classical composers
American jazz composers
American male jazz composers
American jazz pianists
American male pianists
American music arrangers
American jazz bandleaders
20th-century classical composers
21st-century classical composers
Musicians from Winnipeg
People from Tolland County, Connecticut
McGill University School of Music alumni
Rutgers University alumni
University of Connecticut faculty
21st-century American composers
American male classical composers
American classical composers
20th-century Canadian pianists
20th-century American composers
Jazz musicians from Connecticut
21st-century Canadian pianists
20th-century American male musicians
21st-century American male musicians
20th-century American pianists
21st-century American pianists
20th-century jazz composers
21st-century jazz composers